Yasmin Khan (born 1977) is a British historian specialising in the history of British India.

Yasmin Khan may also refer to:
 Yasmin Khan (Doctor Who), a fictional character in the Doctor Who franchise
 Yasmin Khan (writer) (born 1981), British food writer
 Yasmin Aga Khan (born 1949), Swiss-born American philanthropist

See also
 Yasmeen Khan (cricketer) (born 1999), Namibian cricketer
 Yasmeen Khan (actress) (1950–1999), Pakistani film actress